Lila Devi Sitaula is a Nepalese politician, belonging to the People's Socialist Party, Nepal currently serving as the member of the 1st Federal Parliament of Nepal. In the 2017 Nepalese general election, she was elected as a proportional representative from Khas Arya category. She was elected as replacement of Sarita Kumari Giri, who was expelled from the parliament for defying the party's whip.

References

Nepal MPs 2017–2022
Living people
People's Socialist Party, Nepal politicians
1972 births